The 1972 British League season was the 38th season of the top tier of speedway in the United Kingdom and the eighth season of the British League.

Summary
Ipswich Witches moved up from Division Two but London lost two clubs, when the Wembley Lions closed and West Ham Hammers withrew during the early part of the season, reducing the league to eighteen teams.

Belle Vue Aces won their third consecutive title. Their team was littered with great riders including Ivan Mauger, Sören Sjösten and the young Peter Collins; they were backed up by the consistency of Chris Pusey, Eric Broadbelt, Alan Wilkinson and Ken Eyre, which led to a comfortable title win by a clear 12 points.

Oxford Cheetahs had a bizarre season when they were rebranded as Oxford Rebels following a takeover by a new consortium, which included former riders Bob Dugard and Danny Dunton, Dave Lanning and the famous musician Acker Bilk. The team under performed badly finishing 17th from 18 teams despite the new image. To make matters worse they signed a new Norwegian rider Svein Kaasa, who was quickly transferred to Glasgow following poor results. He died riding for Glasgow towards the end of the season (on 29 September) at Hampden Park. Kasa clipped Martin Ashby's bike in a race and hit the wooden fence receiving fatal injuries.

Final table
M = Matches; W = Wins; D = Draws; L = Losses; Pts = Total Points

British League Knockout Cup
The 1972 Speedway Star British League Knockout Cup was the 34th edition of the Knockout Cup for tier one teams. Belle Vue were the winners.

First round

Second round

Quarter-finals

Semi-finals

Final
First leg

Second leg

Belle Vue Aces were declared Knockout Cup Champions, winning on aggregate 82-73.

Final leading averages

Riders & final averages
Belle Vue

 11.36
 8.92
 8.44
 8.20
 6.72
 6.68
 5.56
 5.11

Coventry

 9.23
 8.10
 7.07
 6.85
 5.61
 5.33
 5.19
 4.52
 4.14

Cradley Heath

 10.27
 7.30 
 6.95
 4.90
 4.61
 4.57
 3.73
 2.00
 0.91

Exeter

 9.89
 8.23
 6.29
 6.06 
 5.85
 5.75
 5.28
 4.89
 4.00
 1.18

Glasgow

 8.86
 8.58
 8.41 
 6.91
 4.00
 3.72
 3.47
 2.09
 1.82

Hackney

 9.38 
 7.79
 6.38
 6.32
 6.27
 6.24
 5.78
 4.00
 3.20

Halifax

 10.36 
 8.16
 7.39
 5.87
 5.70
 5.36
 4.03
 3.57
 3.53

Ipswich

 9.39
 7.78
 7.67
 6.96
 5.07
 4.61
 4.46
 4.35

King's Lynn

 10.51 
 (Kid Bodie) 8.94
 8.36
 7.30 
 6.21
 5.72
 5.47
 4.75
 4.33

Leicester

 10.14 
 9.46
 8.68
 4.98
 4.81
 4.47
 3.93
 3.25

Newport

 7.45
 7.15
 6.41 
 5.28
 4.49
 4.36
 3.75
 3.49

Oxford

 9.24
 7.97
 6.49
 6.25
 5.14
 4.81
 4.37
 3.64
 3.00

Poole

 8.90 
 8.00
 6.71
 6.47
 5.75
 5.42
 4.66

Reading

 10.51 
 8.78
 7.73
 7.07
 6.38
 6.24
 5.02
 3.77

Sheffield

 8.85
 8.81
 7.46
 7.34 
 7.15
 7.15 
 6.33 

Swindon

 10.38
 10.08
 6.08
 4.88
 4.62
 4.21
 3.88
 3.56
 2.00

Wimbledon

 10.34
 8.13
 7.45
 5.02
 4.45
 3.96
 3.53
 3.26
 1.71

Wolverhampton

 11.39
 7.76
 6.67
 5.88
 4.59
 4.04
 3.75
 1.65

See also
List of United Kingdom Speedway League Champions
Knockout Cup (speedway)

References

British League
1972 in British motorsport
1972 in speedway